Celia M. Deutsch is an American religious sister, academic, educator, writer, and Old Testament scholar. She is a professor at Barnard College and serves on the Christian Scholars Group on Christian-Jewish Relations.

Personal life
Deutsch was raised in the Roman Catholic faith of her mother, although her father was Jewish. She did not know her father was Jewish until she asked him a question one day and he told her: "I wasn't baptized. I'm a Jew and Jews don't baptize their children". After reading an article about the Sisters of Notre Dame of Sion, she paid them a visit in St. Louis, Missouri. She entered the order at the end of that year, after graduating from high school.

Affiliations
Deutsch is active in numerous professional organizations and is a member of the Society of Biblical Literature Early Jewish and Christian Mysticism Group. She also serves as a consultant to the Interfaith Center of New York and is a member Neighbor to Neighbor (Jews, Christians, Muslims collaborating in the Flatbush/Midwood neighborhood of Brooklyn. She has worked and lectured in Canada, Italy, Israel, and Great Britain.

Writings
 Deutsch, Sister Celia M., Lady Wisdom, Jesus, and the Sages: Metaphor and Social Context in Matthew's Gospel (Trinity Press, 1996)

References

External links
 Journal of the American Academy of Religion excerpts
 Women of God; The Atlantic (January 2002)

Living people
American religious writers
20th-century American Roman Catholic nuns
Barnard College faculty
Roman Catholic biblical scholars
Writers from New York (state)
American people of Jewish descent
Place of birth missing (living people)
Year of birth missing (living people)
Female biblical scholars
21st-century American Roman Catholic nuns